Rosedale is an unincorporated community located within Lawrence Township in Mercer County, New Jersey, United States. The community is centered on the intersection of Carter Road (County Route 569) and Rosedale Road (CR 604). Educational Testing Service's headquarters are located in the northeastern quadrant of the intersection.

Hunt Farmstead is located in Rosedale.

References

Lawrence Township, Mercer County, New Jersey
Unincorporated communities in Mercer County, New Jersey
Unincorporated communities in New Jersey